The play-offs of the 2018 Fed Cup Europe/Africa Zone Group III were the final stages of the Group III zonal competition involving teams from Europe and Africa. Using the positions determined in their pools, the seventeen teams faced off to determine their placing in the 2018 Fed Cup Europe/Africa Zone Group III. The top two teams advanced to Fed Cup Europe/Africa Zone Group II.

Promotional play-offs 
The first placed teams of each pool were drawn in head-to-head rounds. The winners advanced to Group II in 2019.

Lithuania vs. Tunisia

South Africa vs. Malta

3rd to 4th play-offs 
The second placed teams of each pool were drawn in head-to-head rounds to find the equal third and fourth placed teams.

Armenia vs. Cyprus

Finland vs. Morocco

5th to 6th play-offs 
The third placed teams of each pool were drawn in head-to-head rounds to find the equal fifth and sixth placed teams.

Macedonia vs. Algeria

Montenegro vs. Ireland

7th to 8th play-offs 
The fourth placed teams of each pool were drawn in head-to-head rounds to find the seventh and equal eighth placed teams.

Iceland vs. Kosovo

Kenya vs. Uganda

Final placements 

References

External links 
 Fed Cup website

P3